Walter L. White (July 6, 1919 – November 10, 2007) was a former member of the Ohio Senate. He served from 1973 until 1979. His district was the 12th, which encompassed much of West-Central Ohio. Prior to his service in the Senate, White served three terms in the Ohio House, representing the 6th District, which at the time was composed of Allen County.

References

Republican Party Ohio state senators
Republican Party members of the Ohio House of Representatives
1919 births
2007 deaths
20th-century American politicians